The 2014 Gobowling.com 400 was a NASCAR Sprint Cup Series stock car race that was held on August 3, 2014, at Pocono Raceway in Long Pond, Pennsylvania. Contested over 160 laps on the  triangular superspeedway, it was the 21st race of the 2014 NASCAR Sprint Cup Series season.

Dale Earnhardt Jr. won the race, his third win of the season, completing the first season sweep of Pocono since 2006. Kevin Harvick finished second while Joey Logano, Clint Bowyer, and Greg Biffle rounded out the top five. The top rookies of the race were Kyle Larson (11th), Austin Dillon (15th), and Justin Allgaier (16th).

Previous week's race
The previous week at the Brickyard 400, Jeff Gordon took the lead on the final restart and took the checkered flag for the 90th time in his career, to guarantee a spot in the Chase for the Sprint Cup. Carl Edwards, Jimmie Johnson and Joey Logano also clinched spots in the Chase. Kasey Kahne fell to fifth on the restart, and ran out of fuel on the final lap, finishing sixth. Gordon described his race win as "nothing better, especially in a big race, coming to Victory Lane with your family here", while he "was trying so hard with 10 to go not to focus on the crowd". Kahne reflected on his position at the final restart, stating that he should have picked the outside line, also stating "pretty much let Jeff control that restart. I took off and never spun a tire and the inside had been more grip throughout the race and I started on the inside and I thought it was a great decision. But I didn't spin a tire and Jeff drove right by me."

Report

Background

The track's turns are banked differently; the first is banked at 14°, the second turn at 8° and the final turn with 6°. However, each of the three straightaways are banked at 2°. The front stretch at Pocono Raceway is 3,740 feet long, the longest at the track. The back stretch, is 3,055 feet long, while the short stretch, which connects turn two with turn three, is only 1,780 feet long. The defending race winner from 2013 is Kasey Kahne.

Entry list
The entry list for the Gobowling.com 400 was released on Monday, July 28, 2014 at 9:28 a.m. Eastern time. Forty-three drivers were entered for the race.

Practice

First practice

Qualifying

Larson reflected on recent extensive running at the circuit, in testing and also racing in other events – ARCA and the Camping World Truck Series – since the previous Cup race in June, stating that "for whatever reason I feel like I've adapted pretty well to this track even though it's not a track where you maneuver around and can move from the bottom to the top". Joey Logano qualified alongside Larson on the front row, praising his performance and stating that he "liked tough race tracks and this is one of them". Logano had felt that Kurt Busch had been favorite for pole position, but also commented on Larson's performance, stating "Kyle definitely laid down a good one because I thought my lap was (darn) near perfect and then I got beat, so it's a little frustrating, but, overall, it's a good starting spot".

Qualifying results

Practice (post-qualifying)

Second practice

Final practice

Race

First half

Start

The race was originally scheduled to start at 1:18 P.M. EDT, but with the threat of thunderstorms in the forecast, NASCAR moved the start of the race up by around 10 minutes, with rookie Kyle Larson leading the field. At the second turn of the first lap, Brad Keselowski made contact with Kurt Busch and almost spun out, but saved his car and dropped back to 12th, while Joey Logano took the lead from Larson. Jimmie Johnson's car suffered a cut tire and made contact with the wall on the front stretch on lap eight, bringing out a debris caution a lap later. Logano led the field to the restart on lap 13. On lap 15, Danica Patrick brushed the wall on the exit of turn 2, and after a tire blowout, she hit the same wall the following lap, to bring out the second caution. As the first driver who was a lap down in the field, Johnson was the recipient of the free pass, allowing him to return to the lead lap.

Logano continued to lead as the race resumed on lap 20. On lap 23, Kyle Busch's day ended early with a blown engine; he described the problem as "something between the frame rails doesn't seem to operate correctly right now" to reporters after he had exited the car. He also expressed his disappointment about having to exit the race so early: "It's unfortunate, I thought we had a good car today. Our car has been good this weekend in practices and stuff like that. Obviously you hope for better days, and this M&M's Camry team deserves better days but this ain't one of them". The third caution flag came out on lap 29 when Landon Cassill hit the wall in the same position as Patrick had done so, previously; Patrick profited from the free pass at the caution. Brian Vickers won the race off pit road but Kurt Busch, and eight other cars, stayed out when the leaders came in to pit and assumed the lead for the restart, on lap 34.

Busch's different pit cycle saw him onto pit road ten laps later, at which point Jeff Gordon took the lead. On lap 51, the fourth caution flag came out when Joe Nemechek got turned loose by Kasey Kahne and hit the wall in turn 3. The race restarted on lap 56, with Gordon holding the lead until his next pit stop, on lap 65, returning the lead to Busch. Busch pitted on lap 75, giving the lead to A. J. Allmendinger. Allmendinger made his stop on lap 77, at which point Aric Almirola and David Gilliland each led a lap before making green flag pit stops, while Gordon reclaimed the lead. On lap 84, Gordon officially became the first driver in track history to lead over 1,000 laps. He led until his next green flag pit stop on lap 95 and gave the lead to Kevin Harvick. Harvick made his stop on lap 96 and gave the lead back to Busch. Harvick dropped to the tail end of the field as he was caught speeding on pit road. Busch hit pit road on lap 103 and handed the lead to Matt Kenseth. Kenseth led for three laps before returning the lead back to Gordon.

Second half
The fifth caution came out on lap 112, when Johnson – after going a lap down early in the race and getting up as high as fifth – hit the wall in turn 2. He described his incidents as "I got tight off Turn 1 off the fence" for his first scrape with the wall, and later deemed himself "clueless" at the second hit, stating that "It didn't act like a tire went down. It just went straight. Hopefully we can get a reason why".

The Big One
The race restarted on lap 117, but before the end of the first complete lap after the restart, the sixth caution flag came out for a large crash involving 13 cars on the Long Pond Straightaway. It started when Denny Hamlin got sucked around by air off of Clint Bowyer's car in an outside line of cars and started to spin out. Hamlin saved his car, but Brian Vickers collided with Matt Kenseth while checking up to avoid Hamlin, and collected Aric Almirola, Allmendinger, Brad Keselowski, Paul Menard, Tony Stewart, Justin Allgaier, Harvick, Michael Annett, Martin Truex Jr. and Ricky Stenhouse Jr. While Harvick, Allgaier, and a couple of others continued, many of the cars involved were knocked out of the race; Harvick would later manage to pick his way through to a second-place finish. There were only 15 cars on the lead lap before the restart. Hamlin referred to his part in the incident as being "stuck three-wide" and that he was "sucked around" when Bowyer was passing him. Kenseth expressed his frustration at being involved in the crash, stating that his car had "been in all the big wrecks this year", and that "it seems like you're always in the wrong place at the wrong time".

While under caution – on lap 119 – Gordon achieved his 24,000th career lap led, and led the field to the restart on lap 127. Gordon made his final stop and handed the lead to Harvick on lap 132, before Greg Biffle took the lead four laps later. On lap 139, the seventh caution came out when Allmendinger, laps down with damage from the lap 117 crash, hit the wall in turn 1. The race restarted with 17 laps to go.

Final laps
On lap 147, Dale Earnhardt Jr. passed Biffle for the lead, and had managed to build up a 3.5 second lead on Harvick by lap 153, when it was erased after the eighth caution of the race came out, after Busch hit the wall exiting turn 2. The final restart came with three laps remaining, with Earnhardt Jr. restarting on the prevailing outside lane. He assumed the lead, with Harvick running about a car length behind and Logano just behind them. Earnhardt held off the chasers for the last three laps to win the race, completing the first Pocono sweep since Hamlin in 2006. Earnhardt Jr. reflected on the sweep, stating that his team "definitely went home from the last race and made our car better" and that's what I'm proud of this team for". He also praised the strategy of his crew chief, Steve Letarte. Harvick was impressed with his car's speed in both Pocono races, and that his team "were able to capitalize on it and get a good finish".

Race results

Race summary
 Lead changes: 15
 Cautions: 8 for 35 laps 
 Red flags: 0
 Time of race: 3 hours, 8 minutes and 22 seconds
 Average speed:

Media

Television

Radio

Standings after the race

Drivers' Championship standings

Manufacturers' Championship standings

Note: Only the first sixteen positions are included for the driver standings.

References

Gobowling.com 400
Gobowling.com 400
Gobowling.com 400
NASCAR races at Pocono Raceway